César Alexis Cortés Pinto (born January 9, 1984) is a Chilean footballer who plays for Chilean Primera División club Magallanes as a midfielder.

International career
Cortés made 4 appearances for the Chile national team between 2012 and 2013.

Personal life

Career statistics

Honours

Club
Universidad Católica
 Primera División de Chile: 2005 Clausura

Huachipato
 Primera División de Chile: 2012 Clausura

Universidad de Chile
 Primera División de Chile: 2014–15 Apertura
 Copa Chile (1): 2012–13

Santiago Wanderers
 Copa Chile (1): 2017

Palestino
Copa Chile (1): 2018

Magallanes
Primera B de Chile (1): 2022
Copa Chile (1): 2022
Supercopa de Chile (1): 2023

References

External links
 BDFA profile
 Transfer info

1984 births
Living people
People from Iquique
Chilean footballers
Chile international footballers
Chilean expatriate footballers
Chilean Primera División players
Segunda División players
Ekstraklasa players
Primera B de Chile players
Club Deportivo Universidad Católica footballers
Puerto Montt footballers
Albacete Balompié players
C.D. Huachipato footballers
Everton de Viña del Mar footballers
Polonia Warsaw players
Universidad de Chile footballers
Club Deportivo Palestino footballers
Audax Italiano footballers
Santiago Wanderers footballers
Deportes Magallanes footballers
Magallanes footballers
Chilean expatriate sportspeople in Spain
Chilean expatriate sportspeople in Poland
Expatriate footballers in Spain
Expatriate footballers in Poland
Association football forwards
Chilean football managers